The Anti-Aircraft Target Rocket M2 was a  rocket developed and used by the United States Army during World War II. It was designed to serve as a training target for anti-aircraft guns, capable of simulating attacks by low-flying aircraft. The nosecone of the rocket was ogival, and it was fitted with oversized fins to aid in tracking of the rocket by trainees. 

Shipped with two to three rockets in a package, the Target Rocket Projector M1 was used for the rocket's launching platform. A modification of the basic rocket, designated as the Anti-Aircraft Training Rocket M2A1, replaced the basic M2 in service; it added a flare that ignited on launch to aid in visual tracking of the target that burned for approximately 30 seconds after launch.

References

Notes

Bibliography

Rocket weapons of the United States
World War II weapons of the United States
Military equipment introduced in the 1940s